"It Was Almost Like a Song" is a song written by Hal David and Archie Jordan, and recorded by American country music singer Ronnie Milsap.  It was released in May 1977 as the first single and title track from the album It Was Almost Like a Song.  It became one of the greatest hits of his recording career upon its release in 1977.

Background
"It Was Almost Like a Song" provided the basis for the title of Milsap's biography, Almost Like a Song, which he co-wrote with Tom Carter, and was nominated for two Grammy Awards.

Charts
In July 1977, "It Was Almost Like a Song" was Milsap's eighth No. 1 song on the Billboard magazine Hot Country Songs chart.  The song also became his first Billboard Hot 100 chart entry, peaking No. 16. and also on Billboard's Hot Adult Contemporary Singles chart, where it peaked at No. 7.

Weekly charts

Year-end charts

References

1977 singles
1977 songs
Ronnie Milsap songs
Songs with lyrics by Hal David
Songs written by Archie Jordan
Song recordings produced by Tom Collins (record producer)
RCA Records singles
Torch songs